Gorodok may refer to:

Places
Gorodok, Russia, several inhabited localities in Russia
Gorodok Stadium, part of the Luzhniki Olympic Complex, Moscow, Russia
Haradok (Gorodok), a town in Belarus
Horodok (Gorodok), a town located in Lviv Raion (district), Lviv oblast, Ukraine which was formerly known as Gródek Jagielloński.

Other
Gorodok, the kremlin in Zvenigorod, Moscow Oblast, Russia
Gorodok Gargoyles, a fictional Quidditch team

See also
Horodok (disambiguation)
Bely Gorodok, an urban-type settlement in Tver Oblast, Russia
Kichmengsky Gorodok, a rural locality (a selo) in Vologda Oblast, Russia
Tarnogsky Gorodok, a rural locality (a selo) in Vologda Oblast, Russia